Richard Jed Wyatt (June 5, 1939 (or 1937) in Los Angeles - 7 June 2002) was an American psychiatrist and schizophrenia researcher.

Career and Research
Wyatt graduate from Johns Hopkins University Medical School and joined the NIH in 1967, where he established a schizophrenia research program. In 1972 he became chief of the neuropsychiatry branch at the NIH. He was one of the early pioneers who studied the biological basis of schizophrenia in the lab. His research led to the first evidence that monoamine oxidase inhibitors (MAOIs) suppressed REM sleep and could treat narcolepsy.

He was a prolific writer, educator and teacher, having authored over 800 research articles and 6 books and he has trained many of today's leading neuroscientists. The "Richard J. Wyatt Award" from the International Association for Early Intervention in Mental Health is named after him to honor his efforts regarding early interventions in schizophrenia.

He was married to Rollyn Simon Wyatt and later to Kay Jamison and had three children.  He co-produced (with his wife, Kay Jamison) several films about manic depressive illness.
He died of lung cancer on 7 June 2002 at the age of 63.

External links
 Obituary in the NYT
 NIH obituary

References

Johns Hopkins University alumni
American psychiatrists
20th-century American physicians
21st-century chemists
1939 births
2002 deaths
People from Los Angeles